Edward M. MacGamwell  (January 10, 1878 in Buffalo, New York – May 26, 1924 in Albany, New York), was a professional baseball player who played first base in four games for the 1905 Brooklyn Superbas.

External links

1878 births
1924 deaths
Major League Baseball first basemen
Brooklyn Superbas players
Baseball players from Buffalo, New York
Hamilton (minor league baseball) players
Toronto Canucks players
Taunton Herrings players
Syracuse Stars (minor league baseball) players
Newark Sailors players
Buffalo Bisons (minor league) players
Albany Senators players
Utica Pent-Ups players
Binghamton Bingoes players
Troy Trojans (minor league) players
Haverhill Hustlers players
Lowell Grays players
Bridgeport Crossmen players
Burials at St. Agnes Cemetery